Head Down is the fourth album by electronic music artist Moev, released August 8, 1990. It was their last album released on Nettwerk Records and the last one featuring vocalist Dean Russell, who died in 1994. The album featured Sarah McLachlan on backing vocals in a few tracks.

Track listing

Track information and credits adapted from  AllMusic and the album's liner notes.

*Note that there is no mention of songwriters in the liner notes, however AllMusic lists the band as songwriters.

Musicians

Dean Russell – vocals
Tom Ferris – keyboards, programming
Kelly Cook – bass, drums, programming, guitar, keyboards

Additional musicians
Sarah McLachlan – background vocals (4, 5, 7)

Production
John Fryer – Producer, Drum Programming, Recording
Dean Russell – Producer
Tom Ferris – Producer
Kelly Cook – Producer
Ken Marshall – Recorder

References

1990 albums
Moev albums
Nettwerk Records albums